Saint-Brès is a commune in the Hérault department in the Occitanie region in southern France.

Population

See also
Communes of the Hérault department

References

Communes of Hérault
Hérault communes articles needing translation from French Wikipedia